Liquid Metal may refer to:

 A liquid metal, which has a relatively low melting point, such as mercury, tin or lead
 Any metal in a liquid state
 Liquid metallic hydrogen
 Liquidmetal, a type of metallic glass
 Liquid Metal (Sirius XM), a radio channel

See also
 Liquid
 Metal